The Lloyd Woman's Club (also known as the Lloyd Home Demonstration Club) is a historic woman's club in Lloyd, Florida, and a Home Demonstration Club location. It is located on Bond Street. On August 10, 1998, it was added to the U.S. National Register of Historic Places.

See also
List of Registered Historic Woman's Clubhouses in Florida

References

National Register of Historic Places in Jefferson County, Florida
Women's clubs in Florida
Women's club buildings in Florida
Vernacular architecture in Florida